A bearskin is a tall fur cap.

Bearskin may also refer to:

Bearskin (German fairy tale), a traditional German fairy tale, collected by the Brothers Grimm, about a deal with the devil
Bearskin (French fairy tale), a French literary fairy tale by Marie-Madeleine de Lubert
Bearskin (film), a 1986 German film
Bearskin Airlines, a small airline operating in Ontario and Manitoba, Canada
Mount Bearskin, Antarctica

Persons with the surname
 Leaford Bearskin (1921–2012), American tribal leader and military officer

See also
 Bearskin Lake (disambiguation)